Agonopterix tolli is a moth in the family Depressariidae. It was described by Hans-Joachim Hannemann in 1959. It is found in Siberia.

References

Moths described in 1959
Agonopterix
Moths of Asia